Telugu is a Dravidian language spoken predominantly in the Indian states of Andhra Pradesh, Telangana and Yanam district of Puducherry, India by the Telugu people. Traditional Telugu names follow a distinct naming system that sets it apart from the rest of South Asia. In which, the family name is in the genitive case, hence stands first, which is then followed by given name(s). This practice of placing family names first is also seen amongst Han Chinese, Korean, Japanese and Hungarian peoples.

Introduction
The "family name (surname), given name" format used by Telugu people is contrasted from other South Asian ethnic groups and western countries, where family name typically appears last. This might cause confusion to varying degrees within India and the rest of the world.

On some occasions, a caste name is also suffixed at the end. For example, Devula Rama Naidu, where Devula is the family name, Rama is the given name and Naidu is the caste name.

This practice of placing family name first is also seen in Korean , Japanese Chinese and Hungarians.

Personal names (Given names)

Telugu people are often named after Hindu gods or goddesses that have cultural significance. Often, given names are compound words and followed by a caste suffix including Naidu, Shastry, Sharma, Rao, Choudhary, Raju, Varma, Reddy, Yadav, Goud, Setty, and Gupta. When the given name is a compound word e.g. Venkata Satyanarayana Naidu, the last word before the caste suffix (i.e. Satyanarayana) is generally used by the callers.

Family names

The majority of Telugu people possess family names called intipēru

Telugu family names are sometimes named after a place or occupation or some historic event in family. For example, Pasupaleti after Pasupaleru, Kondaveeti after Kondaveedu, Kandukuri is named after Kandukuru, or such as the ones ending in wada, palli (village), veedhi (street) or giri (hill),  Vungrala which means the person with rings or the maker of rings, Gurram which means trading in horses, Kasu mean coin may mean jeweler etc. 
Unlike western names, where family name is well known over personal name, it is contrary among the Telugu speaking states, where person is well known by given name, without ever hearing their family name.

Telugu family names are often abbreviated and written, e.g., P. V. Narasimha Rao, etc. unlike the western names where given name is often abbreviated.

References

Indian names
Telugu names
Names by culture
Telugu society
Telugu language